The Scent of Rain and Lightning is a 2017 American drama film directed by Blake Robbins and written by Jeff Robison and Casey Twenter, based on the novel of the same name by Nancy Pickard. The film stars an ensemble cast that includes Maika Monroe, Maggie Grace, Justin Chatwin, Mark Webber, Logan Miller, Will Patton, and Brad Carter.

The film had its world premiere at the Atlanta Film Festival on March 25, 2017 and had a limited release on February 16, 2018. It received positive reviews from critics.

Plot 

When a young woman learns her parents' killer has been released from jail, she is forced to revisit old wounds while discovering the destructive power of hate and the true cost of family secrets fully revealing themselves.

Cast 
 Maika Monroe as Jody Linder
 Meg Crosbie as Young Jody Linder
 Maggie Grace as Laurie
 Justin Chatwin as Hugh Jay Linder
 Mark Webber as Chase
 Logan Miller as Collin Croyle
 Will Patton as Senior
 Brad Carter as Billy
 Aaron Poole as Meryl
 Bonnie Bedelia as Annabelle
 Blake Robbins as Sheriff Don Phelps
 Ken Wood as Deputy Sheriff Mason Walker

Production 
On July 23, 2015, it was announced that Nancy Pickard's novel The Scent of Rain and Lightning was being adapted into a film, which Blake Robbins would direct, Maggie Grace, Maika Monroe and Brad Carter leading the cast. Casey Twenter, Jeff Robison, and Jeff Johnson would produce the film through No Coast Entertainment, along with Kevin Waller through Gerson Productions and Michael Davis and Grace. On November 5, 2015, it was announced Justin Chatwin, Mark Webber, Logan Miller, Aaron Poole, Will Patton and Bonnie Bedelia had joined the cast.

Filming
Principal photography on the film began on October 27, 2015 in Oklahoma, and concluded on November 21, 2015, with a total of 21 days of shooting.

Release
The film had its world premiere at the Atlanta Film Festival on March 25, 2017. Shortly after, SP Releasing acquired distribution rights to the film and set it for a February 16, 2018, release.

Reception
On review aggregator website Rotten Tomatoes, the film holds an approval rating of 100%, based on 8 reviews, and an average rating of 7.6/10. On Metacritic, the film has a weighted average score of 76 out of 100, indicating "generally positive reviews".

References

External links 
 

2017 films
American drama films
2017 drama films
Films based on American novels
Films shot in Oklahoma
2010s English-language films
2010s American films